The Alameda-Depot Historic District, in Las Cruces, New Mexico, is a historic district which was listed on the National Register of Historic Places in 1985.

It has also been known as the Las Cruces Depot-Alameda Historic District.

It includes properties centered around Pioneer Park and extending up Alameda Boulevard, in an area of about 42 blocks.

Year of construction: 1881

Architecture: Late 19th And 20th Century Revivals, Late Victorian, Mission/Spanish Revival
Other names: 
Historic function: Domestic; Commerce/trade
Historic subfunction: Single Dwelling; Secondary Structure; Business
Criteria: event, architecture/engineering

It includes the Las Cruces New Mexico Railroad Museum.

References

Historic districts on the National Register of Historic Places in New Mexico
National Register of Historic Places in Doña Ana County, New Mexico
Victorian architecture in New Mexico
Mission Revival architecture in New Mexico
Buildings and structures completed in 1881